The Ambala Cavalry Brigade was a cavalry brigade of the British Indian Army formed in 1904 as a result of the Kitchener Reforms.  It was mobilized as 3rd (Ambala) Cavalry Brigade at the outbreak of the First World War as part of the 1st Indian Cavalry Division and departed for France.  It served on the Western Front with the 1st and 2nd Indian Cavalry Divisions until it was broken up in March 1918.

History
The Kitchener Reforms, carried out during Lord Kitchener's tenure as Commander-in-Chief, India (1902–09), completed the unification of the three former Presidency armies, the Punjab Frontier Force, the Hyderabad Contingent and other local forces into one Indian Army.  Kitchener identified the Indian Army's main task as the defence of the North-West Frontier against foreign aggression (particularly Russian expansion into Afghanistan) with internal security relegated to a secondary role.  The Army was organized into divisions and brigades that would act as field formations but also included internal security troops.

The Ambala Brigade (also referred to as Umballa Brigade) was formed in July 1904 as a result of the Kitchener Reforms.  The brigade formed part of the 3rd (Lahore) Division.  In 1908, it was redesignated as Ambala Cavalry Brigade.

3rd (Ambala) Cavalry Brigade
In August 1914, the brigade was mobilized as the 3rd (Ambala) Cavalry Brigade and assigned to the 1st Indian Cavalry Division.  A new Ambala Brigade was formed in November 1914 as part of the 3rd Lahore Divisional Area to take over the original brigade's internal security duties.

With 1st Indian Cavalry Division, it departed Bombay on 16 October and landed at Marseilles on 7 November.  It concentrated around Orléans on 16 November and was sent up to the Front on 26 November.  While in France, the brigade was known by its geographical rather than numerical designation so as to avoid confusion with the British 3rd Cavalry Brigade also serving on the Western Front at the same time.  On 15 September 1915, the brigade swapped places with the 5th (Mhow) Cavalry Brigade from 2nd Indian Cavalry Division.

In 1916, the brigade took part in the Battle of the Somme, notably the Battle of Bazentin (1417 July) and the Battle of Flers–Courcelette (1522 September).  In 1917, the brigade took part in the Battle of Cambrai, notably the Tank Attack (2021 November) and the German Counter-attacks (30 November3 December).  At other times it was held in reserve in case of a breakthrough, although it did send parties to the trenches on a number of occasions. They would hold the line, or act as Pioneers; such parties were designated as the Ambala Battalion.

Dissolved
In March 1918, the brigade was broken up in France. The British units (8th (King's Royal Irish) Hussars and X Battery, RHA) remained in France and the Indian elements were sent to Egypt. On 24 April 1918, these were merged with the 5th Mounted Brigade and joined the new 2nd Mounted Division. On 22 July 1918 the 5th Mounted Brigade was redesignated as 13th Cavalry Brigade and the division as 5th Cavalry Division.

Orders of battle

Commanders
The Ambala Brigade / Ambala Cavalry Brigade / 3rd (Ambala) Cavalry Brigade had the following commanders:

See also

 Ambala Brigade formed in India to replace the original brigade when it was mobilized 
 Indian Cavalry Corps order of battle First World War
 Indian Expeditionary Force A

Notes

References

Bibliography

External links
 
 
 

C03
Cavalry brigades of the British Indian Army
Military units and formations established in 1904
Military units and formations disestablished in 1918